17α-Bromoprogesterone (17α-BP) is a progestin which was first described in 1957 and was never marketed. It is about twice as potent as progesterone in terms of progestogenic activity in animal bioassays. 17α-BP is a parent compound of haloprogesterone (6α-fluoro-17α-bromoprogesterone) and 6α-methyl-17α-bromoprogesterone.

See also
 17α-Hydroxyprogesterone
 17α-Methylprogesterone
 19-Norprogesterone

References

Abandoned drugs
Organobromides
Diketones
Pregnanes
Progestogens